Tomasi Naidole (c. 1932 – c. 2005) was a Fijian rugby union and professional rugby league footballer who played as a .

Naidole started his career in rugby union, representing the Fiji national team between 1954 and 1959. In 1964, he moved to England and switched codes to play rugby league for Huddersfield.

His two sons, Joe and Tom, also went on to play rugby league at Huddersfield.

References

External links
Profile at ESPN Scrum
Profile at Fiji Rugby Union

1932 births
2005 deaths
English people of I-Taukei Fijian descent
Fiji international rugby union players
Fijian emigrants to England
Fijian rugby league players
Fijian rugby union players
Huddersfield Giants players
I-Taukei Fijian people
Rugby league wingers
Rugby union wings
Sportspeople from Suva